WIDL (Web Interface Definition Language) is a 1997 proposal for interactions between website APIs. This interface description language is based on XML.

External links
 Web Interface Definition Language (WIDL) at the W3C website

Web standards